Rock Creek is a tributary of the Palouse River in the U.S. state of Washington. The source of the creek is Pine Lakes in the Turnbull National Wildlife Refuge (TNWR).

Rock Creek drains Rock Lake and, upstream from that, Bonnie Lake. Lakes within the Rock Creek drainage with managed fisheries include Rock and Bonnie Lakes, and Chapman Lake. Many small lakes in the drainage have no outlets, and some evaporate completely in dry weather.

Geological significance

As Rock Creek crosses the Columbia River Plateau, it passes through the Channeled Scablands, created by the Missoula Floods that swept across eastern Washington during the Pleistocene epoch. The creek follows one of many paths taken by the floods as they cut through the Columbia River Basalt. Notable geologic features in the Rock Creek basin include the scabland and Rock Lake. The creek parallels the adjacent Cow Creek scabland and joins the Palouse River just before it departs Washtucna Coulee, the abandoned flood-scoured course of the river.

Access
The Palouse to Cascades State Park Trail follows Rock Creek for a portion of the drainage, allowing unique access, particularly to Rock Lake.

See also
 List of rivers of Washington

References

Rivers of Spokane County, Washington
Rivers of Whitman County, Washington
Rivers of Adams County, Washington
Rivers of Washington (state)